Karikkad  is a village in Thrissur district in the state of Kerala, India.

Demographics
 India census, Karikkad had a population of 10898 with 5148 males and 5750 females.

References

Villages in Thrissur district